Tom Sweep is an animated short film made by Michaël Dudok de Wit in 1992.

About the film
The author, Michaël Dudok de Wit, said that "Tom Sweep" was intended to be one of a series of films. Unlike the two following films "The Monk and the Fish" (1994) and "Father and Daughter" (2000), it is structured around a single camera angle.

External links
Tom Sweep at IMDB

French animated short films
1992 films
Films directed by Michaël Dudok de Wit
1990s French films